Frank Carr (September 26, 1893 – September 4, 1981) was an American equestrian. He competed at the 1924 Summer Olympics and the 1928 Summer Olympics.

References

External links
 

1893 births
1981 deaths
American male equestrians
Olympic equestrians of the United States
Equestrians at the 1924 Summer Olympics
Equestrians at the 1928 Summer Olympics
People from Savannah, Missouri